Mashd N Kutcher (sometimes abbreviated as MNK) are an Australian dance act and electronic band.

Mashd N Kutcher are best known for their songs "Do It Now" and "My Sunshine", which samples Len's song "Steal My Sunshine". In 2020 they came to public attention in Australia after remixing a speech given by Premier of the state of Victoria, Daniel Andrews, reporting on an early outbreak of COVID-19 in the state. The resulting dance track, Get on the Beers, made it seem that the Premier's instructions to his citizens was to do their civic duty and "get on the beers". The original press conference saw Andrews warn Victorians that it was not appropriate to get on the beers, due to the greater risk of the spread of the coronavirus.

The act has performed in sold-out tours in Australia, Asia, New Zealand, North America, South America and Europe. Their name is a pun on American actor Ashton Kutcher.

Career 

In December 2014, Mashd N Kutcher released their debut single "Do It Now". The song peaked at number 33 on the ARIA Charts and was certified platinum in Australia.

In 2015, Mashd N Kutcher took recording equipment into six Subway stores in Brisbane and captured noises from the ice machine to the beeping of the oven and staff talking to customers before remixing the sounds into a piece called "Sounds of Subway".

In December 2015, Mashd N Kutcher released "My Sunshine", a song which heavily samples Len's "Steal My Sunshine". "My Sunshine" peaked at number 18 on the ARIA charts and was certified platinum.

In 2017, Mashd N Kutcher signed to powerhouse-label Universal Music Group and publishing company BMG.

In February 2018, Mashd N Kutcher were the headline act at the inaugural AFLX Grand Final.

In March 2018, Mashd N Kutcher released "Need Me" which includes a sample of "Lovefool" by The Cardigans.

In July 2018, Mashd N Kutcher released "Don't Stop Believin'", a re-work of Journey'song.

In April 2020, Mashd N Kutcher released "Get on the Beers". The song uses and reorders the press conference words by Victorian Premier Daniel Andrews, during the COVID-19 pandemic. The track placed 12th in the Triple J Hottest 100, 2020 and was personally introduced by Andrews.

Mashd N Kutcher announced their Mash Machine East Coast tour which was scheduled to take place in July and August 2021.

In October 2021, Mashd N Kutcher released a new record "On My Mind", an interpolation of the 2003 Powderfinger song "On My Mind".

In 2022, the band launched a new online content series entitled ‘Will It Mash?’ mixing together different songs and genres with the reactions of a guest. Their first celebrity guest was Murray Cook of popular children's group The Wiggles, and has also featured Triple J radio national breakfast hosts Bryce and Ebony, as well as UFC title holder Alexander Volkanovski.

In March 2023, the band released their rework of "You're the Voice".

Discography

Singles

Awards and nominations

APRA Awards
The APRA Awards are held in Australia and New Zealand by the Australasian Performing Right Association to recognise songwriting skills, sales and airplay performance by its members annually.

! 
|-
| 2022
| "Get On the Beers” (featuring Dan Andrews)
| Most Performed Dance/Electronic Work
| 
| 
|-

References 

Musical groups established in 2014
Australian dance music groups
Australian electronic musicians
Australian metalcore musical groups
2014 establishments in Australia